Homecoming is a 1948 romantic drama starring Clark Gable and Lana Turner. It was the third of their four films together, and like two of the others, was about a couple caught up in World War II.

Plot
Ulysses Johnson (Clark Gable) is an American surgeon coming back from World War II. As he is sitting on the transport boat taking him back to America, he is asked by a reporter about his experiences during the war. Johnson begins to tell his story, beginning in 1941. Johnson is the chief surgeon at a hospital, a man free of emotional attachment to his patients. He joins the Army and has a cocktail party with his wife, Penny (Anne Baxter). During the party, a colleague of his, Dr. Robert Sunday (John Hodiak), accuses Johnson of being unsentimental, a hypocrite, and joining the Army out of purely selfish motives. Penny breaks up the fray and she and Johnson spend their last night together sipping cocktails.

Johnson then boards a transport ship, where he meets Lt. Jane "Snapshot" McCall (Lana Turner). Although they initially do not get along, they eventually find they have a lot in common and become fast friends. Their friendship is at numerous moments tested as they begin to fall in love with one another. After taking a trip to bathe, Johnson and Snapshot come back to the base to find that a friend of Johnson's, Sergeant Monkevickz (Cameron Mitchell), is dying from a malaria-ruptured spleen. Johnson remembers that during his argument with Dr. Sunday, Sunday mentioned that people in Chester Village, where Monkevickz was from, were dying from malaria and being neglected by physicians. Johnson tells Snapshot that he treated Monkevicks without enough care as to treat him like a human being. To atone, Johnson asks Penny to visit Monkevickz's father. When Penny arrives at the house, she finds Doctor Sunday there and confesses that she is jealous of Snapshot, whom Johnson has mentioned in letters, and believes that Johnson and Snapshot are having an affair.

Meanwhile, Johnson and Snapshot have grown closer and when she is reassigned to a different outfit, she and Johnson kiss. They depart, but again encounter one another in Paris. They fall back in love, but leave to rescue the 299th division, which has fallen victim to enemy fire in the Battle of the Bulge. The story turns back to Johnson returning to his home following the war as a far more world-weary man. He returns to Penny, a ghost of his former self. He apologizes to Dr. Sunday for not heeding his warnings about the malaria in Chester Village and confesses to Penny his love for Snapshot, but tells Penny that Snapshot died of a shell fragment wound. The film ends leaving the viewer to assume that Johnson and Penny patch up their differences and live happier lives.

Cast
 Clark Gable as Col. Ulysses Delby "Lee" Johnson
 Lana Turner as Lt. Jane "Snapshot" McCall
 Anne Baxter as Penny Johnson
 John Hodiak as Dr. Robert Sunday
 Ray Collins as Lt. Col. Avery Silver
 Gladys Cooper as Mrs. Kirby
 Cameron Mitchell as Sgt. Monkevickz
 Marshall Thompson as Sgt. McKeen
 Lurene Tuttle as Miss Stoker

Background
Homecoming was devised by writer Sidney Kingsley as a story in 1944 called The Homecoming of Ulysses. It was the third film MGM assigned to Gable following his return from the service himself. His performance is unusually poignant, far different from his assignments from MGM in the thirties. Meanwhile, Lana Turner was assigned the particularly unglamorous role of Jane "Snapshot" McCall, and while the glamor girl was underrated, she gave a surprisingly earthy performance, coming across as warm and genuine, far different from other roles she had played earlier in the forties. This film also provided the third Gable/Turner pairing, which had proved remarkably successful in their first film together, Honky Tonk. The other movie in which they had starred together was Somewhere I'll Find You (1942). They would follow Homecoming with Betrayed (1954), which resulted in Gable and Turner's last pairing together, and Gable's last performance at MGM. Also, in Homecoming, Anne Baxter starred alongside husband John Hodiak, as he played the man who offered her character a shoulder to cry on.

Reception
The film was one of MGM's biggest hits of the year, earning $3,699,000 in the US and Canada and $1,895,000 elsewhere resulting in a profit of $1,047,000.

References

External links
 
 
 
 

1948 films
American black-and-white films
Metro-Goldwyn-Mayer films
Films directed by Mervyn LeRoy
1948 romantic drama films
American romantic drama films
Films scored by Bronisław Kaper
1940s American films